Illinois's 6th House of Representatives district is a Representative district within the Illinois House of Representatives located in Cook County, Illinois. It has been represented by Democrat Sonya Harper since 2015. The district was previously represented by Democrat Esther Golar from 2005 to 2015.

The district covers parts of Chicago, and of Chicago's neighborhoods, it covers parts of Armour Square, Bridgeport, Chicago Lawn, Douglas, Englewood, Fuller Park, Grand Boulevard, Greater Grand Crossing, Loop, Near North Side, Near South Side, Near West Side, New City, and West Englewood.

Representative district history

Prominent representatives

List of representatives

1849 – 1855

1855 – 1873

1957 – 1973

1983 – Present

Historic District Boundaries

Electoral history

2030 – 2022

2020 – 2012

2010 – 2002

2000 – 1992

1990 – 1982

1970 – 1962

1960 – 1956

Notes

References

Illinois House of Representatives districts
Government of Chicago